Windsor, formerly known as North Beach, is a gated community and census-designated place (CDP) on North Hutchinson Island in Indian River County, Florida, United States. The population was 256 at the 2010 census. It is part of the Sebastian–Vero Beach Metropolitan Statistical Area.

Geography
It is bordered to the south by the town of Orchid, to the north by Pelican Island National Wildlife Refuge, to the west by the Indian River Lagoon, and to the east by the Atlantic Ocean. Florida State Road A1A runs along the eastern side of the community, leading north  to Melbourne Beach and south  to Vero Beach.

Demographics

As of the census of 2000, when the CDP was known as "North Beach", there were 243 people, 93 households, and 86 families residing in the CDP. The racial makeup of the CDP was 98.35% White, 0.41% African American, and 1.23% from two or more races. Hispanic or Latino of any race were 2.06% of the population.

There were 93 households, out of which 32.3% had children under the age of 18 living with them, 84.9% were married couples living together, 7.5% had a female householder with no husband present, and 6.5% were non-families. 6.5% of all households were made up of individuals, and 2.2% had someone living alone who was 65 years of age or older.  The average household size was 2.61 and the average family size was 2.66.

In the CDP, the population was spread out, with 23.0% under the age of 18, 1.2% from 18 to 24, 16.9% from 25 to 44, 38.7% from 45 to 64, and 20.2% who were 65 years of age or older.  The median age was 50 years. For every 100 females, there were 104.2 males.  For every 100 females age 18 and over, there were 94.8 males.

The median income for a household in the CDP was $70,417, and the median income for a family was $70,417. Males had a median income of $43,750 versus $0 for females. The per capita income for the CDP was $79,269.  None of the population or families were below the poverty line.

Places of interest
McLarty Treasure Museum
Pelican Island National Wildlife Refuge
Sebastian Inlet State Park

References

External links
Windsor community official website

Census-designated places in Indian River County, Florida
Census-designated places in Florida
Populated coastal places in Florida on the Atlantic Ocean